Alexandra Hoy was the associate chief justice of the Court of Appeal for Ontario. She is a graduate of the Osgoode Hall Law School and was previously appointed to the Ontario Superior Court of Justice.

References

Justices of the Court of Appeal for Ontario
Living people
Year of birth missing (living people)
Place of birth missing (living people)
Osgoode Hall Law School alumni